Isaäc van Hoornbeek (9 December 1655 – 17 June 1727) was Grand Pensionary of Holland, the political official of the entire Dutch Republic, from 12 September 1720 until his death in 1727. 

Hoornbeek was born in Leiden.  He served as pensionary of Rotterdam before 1720.  He died, aged 71, in The Hague.

References

Extensive biography from the Dutch National Archives .

1655 births
1727 deaths
Dutch States Party politicians
Grand Pensionaries
People from Leiden